North Carolina ratified the Constitution on November 21, 1789, after the beginning of the 1st Congress. Its current senators are Republicans Thom Tillis and Ted Budd. Jesse Helms was North Carolina's longest-serving senator (1973–2003).

List of senators

|- style="height:2em"
| colspan=3 | Vacant
| nowrap | Nov 21, 1789 –Nov 27, 1789
| North Carolina ratified the Constitution Nov 21, 1789 but didn't elect its senators until Nov 27, 1789.	
| rowspan=3 | 1
| rowspan=2 
| rowspan=4 | 1
| North Carolina ratified the Constitution Nov 21, 1789 but didn't elect its senators until Nov 27, 1789.	
| nowrap | Nov 21, 1789 –Nov 27, 1789
| colspan=3 | Vacant

|- style="height:2em"
! rowspan=2 | 1
| rowspan=2 align=left | Samuel Johnston
| rowspan=2  | Pro-Admin.
| rowspan=2 nowrap | Nov 27, 1789 –Mar 3, 1793
| rowspan=2 | Elected in 1789.Lost re-election.
| rowspan=3 | Elected in 1789.
| rowspan=3 nowrap | Nov 27, 1789 –Mar 3, 1795
| rowspan=2  | Pro-Admin.
| rowspan=3 align=right | Benjamin Hawkins
! rowspan=3 | 1

|- style="height:2em"
| 

|- style="height:2em"
! rowspan=3 | 2
| rowspan=3 align=left | Alexander Martin
|  | Anti-Admin.
| rowspan=3 nowrap | Mar 4, 1793 –Mar 3, 1799
| rowspan=3 | Elected in 1792.Lost re-election.
| rowspan=3 | 2
| 
|  | Anti-Admin.

|- style="height:2em"
| rowspan=2  | Democratic-Republican
| 
| rowspan=3 | 2
| rowspan=3 | Elected in 1795.
| rowspan=3 nowrap | Mar 4, 1795 –Mar 3, 1801
| rowspan=3  | Democratic-Republican
| rowspan=3 align=right | Timothy Bloodworth
! rowspan=3 | 2

|- style="height:2em"
| 

|- style="height:2em"
! rowspan=3 | 3
| rowspan=3 align=left |  Jesse Franklin
| rowspan=3  | Democratic-Republican
| rowspan=3 nowrap | Mar 4, 1799 –Mar 3, 1805
| rowspan=3 | Elected in 1799.Lost re-election.
| rowspan=3 | 3
| 

|- style="height:2em"
| 
| rowspan=5 | 3
| rowspan=4 | Elected in 1800.Resigned to return to the State Superior Court.
| rowspan=4 nowrap | Mar 4, 1801 –Feb 17, 1807
| rowspan=4  | Democratic-Republican
| rowspan=4 align=right | David Stone
! rowspan=4 | 3

|- style="height:2em"
| 

|- style="height:2em"
| colspan=3 | Vacant
| nowrap | Mar 4, 1805 –Dec 22, 1805
| Montfort Stokes was elected in 1804 but refused the position.
| rowspan=5 | 4
| rowspan=3 

|- style="height:2em"
! rowspan=11 | 4
| rowspan=11 align=left |  James Turner
| rowspan=11  | Democratic-Republican
| rowspan=11 nowrap | Dec 22, 1805 –Nov 21, 1816
| rowspan=4 | Elected to finish the vacant term.

|- style="height:2em"
|  
| nowrap | Feb 17, 1807 –Mar 3, 1807
| colspan=3 | Vacant

|- style="height:2em"
| 
| rowspan=3 | 4
| rowspan=3 | Elected in 1806.Retired.
| rowspan=3 nowrap | Mar 4, 1807 –Mar 3, 1813
| rowspan=3  | Democratic-Republican
| rowspan=3 align=right | Jesse Franklin
! rowspan=3 | 4

|- style="height:2em"
| 

|- style="height:2em"
| rowspan=7 | Re-elected in 1810.Resigned due to ill health.
| rowspan=9 | 5
| 

|- style="height:2em"
| rowspan=3 
| rowspan=9 | 5
| Elected in 1812.Resigned.
| nowrap | Mar 4, 1813 –Dec 24, 1814
|  | Democratic-Republican
| align=right | David Stone
! 5

|- style="height:2em"
|  
| nowrap | Dec 24, 1814 –Dec 1814
| colspan=3 | Vacant

|- style="height:2em"
| rowspan=2 | Elected to finish Stone's term.Resigned without having qualified.
| rowspan=2 nowrap | Dec 1814 –Dec 5, 1815
| rowspan=2  | Democratic-Republican
| rowspan=2 align=right | Francis Locke Jr.
! rowspan=2 | 6

|- style="height:2em"
| rowspan=5 

|- style="height:2em"
|  
| nowrap | Dec 5, 1815 –Dec 13, 1815
| colspan=3 | Vacant

|- style="height:2em"
| rowspan=4 | Elected to finish Locke's term.
| rowspan=9 nowrap | Dec 13, 1815 –Nov 14, 1828
| rowspan=7  | Democratic-Republican
| rowspan=9 align=right | Nathaniel Macon
! rowspan=9 | 7

|- style="height:2em"
| colspan=3 | Vacant
| nowrap | Nov 21, 1816 –Dec 4, 1816
|  

|- style="height:2em"
! rowspan=4 | 5
| rowspan=4 align=left | Montfort Stokes
| rowspan=4  | Democratic-Republican
| rowspan=4 nowrap | Dec 4, 1816 –Mar 3, 1823
| Elected to finish Turner's term.

|- style="height:2em"
| rowspan=3 | Elected in 1816.Lost re-election.
| rowspan=3 | 6
| 

|- style="height:2em"
| 
| rowspan=3 | 6
| rowspan=3 | Re-elected in 1818.

|- style="height:2em"
| 

|- style="height:2em"
! rowspan=6 | 6
| rowspan=6 align=left | John Branch
|  | Democratic-Republican
| rowspan=6 nowrap | Mar 4, 1823 –Mar 9, 1829
| rowspan=5 | Elected in 1822.
| rowspan=5 | 7
| 

|- style="height:2em"
| rowspan=5  | Jacksonian
| 
| rowspan=7 | 7
| rowspan=2 | Re-elected in 1825.Resigned.
| rowspan=2  | Jacksonian

|- style="height:2em"
| rowspan=3 

|- style="height:2em"
|  
| nowrap | Nov 14, 1828 –Dec 15, 1828
| colspan=3 | Vacant

|- style="height:2em"
| rowspan=4 | Elected to finish Macon's term.Retired.
| rowspan=4 nowrap | Dec 15, 1828 –Mar 3, 1831
| rowspan=4  | Jacksonian
| rowspan=4 align=right |  James Iredell Jr.
! rowspan=4 | 8

|- style="height:2em"
| Re-elected in 1828.Resigned to become U.S. Secretary of the Navy.
| rowspan=5 | 8
| rowspan=3 

|- style="height:2em"
| colspan=3 | Vacant
| nowrap | Mar 9, 1829 –Dec 9, 1829
|  

|- style="height:2em"
! rowspan=8 | 7
| rowspan=8 align=left | Bedford Brown
| rowspan=6  | Jacksonian
| rowspan=8 nowrap | Dec 9, 1829 –Nov 16, 1840
| rowspan=3 | Elected to finish Branch's term.

|- style="height:2em"
| 
| rowspan=5 | 8
| rowspan=3 | Elected in 1830.Resigned.
| rowspan=3 nowrap | Mar 4, 1831 –Mar 19, 1836
|  | Jacksonian
| rowspan=3 align=right | Willie Mangum
! rowspan=3 | 9

|- style="height:2em"
| 
| rowspan=2  | NationalRepublican

|- style="height:2em"
| rowspan=5 | Re-elected in 1835.Resigned.
| rowspan=7 | 9
| rowspan=3 

|- style="height:2em"
|  
| nowrap | Mar 19, 1836 –Dec 5, 1836
| colspan=3 | Vacant

|- style="height:2em"
| Elected to finish Mangum's term.
| rowspan=3 nowrap | Dec 5, 1836 –Nov 16, 1840
|  | Jacksonian
| rowspan=3 align=right | Robert Strange
! rowspan=3 | 10

|- style="height:2em"
| rowspan=2  | Democratic
| 
| rowspan=5 | 9
| rowspan=2 | Elected to full term in 1836.Resigned.
| rowspan=2  | Democratic

|- style="height:2em"
| rowspan=3 

|- style="height:2em"
| colspan=3 | Vacant
| nowrap | Nov 16, 1840 –Nov 25, 1840
|  
|  
| nowrap | Nov 16, 1840 –Nov 25, 1840
| colspan=3 | Vacant

|- style="height:2em"
! rowspan=9 | 8
| rowspan=9 align=left | Willie Mangum
| rowspan=9  | Whig
| rowspan=9 nowrap | Nov 25, 1840 –Mar 3, 1853
| Elected to finish Brown's term.
| rowspan=2 | Elected to finish Strange's term.
| rowspan=2 nowrap | Nov 25, 1840 –Mar 3, 1843
| rowspan=2  | Whig
| rowspan=2 align=right | William Alexander Graham
! rowspan=2 | 11

|- style="height:2em"
| rowspan=5 | Elected in 1841.
| rowspan=5 | 10
| 

|- style="height:2em"
| 
| rowspan=5 | 10
| rowspan=2 | Elected in 1843.Resigned.
| rowspan=2 nowrap | Mar 4, 1843 –Jul 25, 1846
| rowspan=2  | Democratic
| rowspan=2 align=right | William Henry Haywood Jr.
! rowspan=2 | 12

|- style="height:2em"
| rowspan=3 

|- style="height:2em"
|  
| nowrap | Jul 25, 1846 –Nov 25, 1846
| colspan=3 | Vacant

|- style="height:2em"
| rowspan=2 | Elected to finish Haywood's term.
| rowspan=6 nowrap | Nov 25, 1846 –Mar 3, 1855
| rowspan=6  | Whig
| rowspan=6 align=right | George Badger
! rowspan=6 | 13

|- style="height:2em"
| rowspan=3 | Re-elected in 1847.Lost re-election.
| rowspan=3 | 11
| 

|- style="height:2em"
| 
| rowspan=4 | 11
| rowspan=4 | Re-elected in 1849.Retired.

|- style="height:2em"
| 

|- style="height:2em"
| colspan=3 | Vacant
| nowrap | Mar 4, 1853 –Dec 6, 1854
| Legislature failed to elect
| rowspan=7 | 12
| rowspan=2 

|- style="height:2em"
! rowspan=6 | 9
| rowspan=6 align=left | David Reid
| rowspan=6  | Democratic
| rowspan=6 nowrap | Dec 6, 1854 –Mar 3, 1859
| rowspan=6 | Elected to finish vacant term.Lost re-election.

|- style="height:2em"
| 
| rowspan=6 | 12
| rowspan=2 | Elected in 1855.Resigned to become U.S. District Court Judge.
| rowspan=2 nowrap | Mar 4, 1855 –May 5, 1858
| rowspan=2  | Democratic
| rowspan=2 align=right | Asa Biggs
! rowspan=2 | 14

|- style="height:2em"
| 

|- style="height:2em"
|  
| nowrap | May 5, 1858 –May 7, 1858
| colspan=3 | Vacant

|- style="height:2em"
| Appointed to continue Biggs's term.
| rowspan=4 nowrap | May 7, 1858 –Mar 11, 1861
| rowspan=4  | Democratic
| rowspan=4 align=right | Thomas Clingman
! rowspan=4 | 15

|- style="height:2em"
| rowspan=2 | Elected Nov 23, 1858 to finish Biggs's term.

|- style="height:2em"
! rowspan=3 | 10
| rowspan=3 align=left | Thomas Bragg
| rowspan=3  | Democratic
| rowspan=3 nowrap | Mar 4, 1859 –Mar 8, 1861
| rowspan=3 | Elected in 1858 or 1859.Resigned and subsequently expelled for support of the Confederacy.
| rowspan=5 | 13
| 

|- style="height:2em"
| rowspan=3 
| rowspan=5 | 13
| Re-elected in 1861.Resigned and subsequently expelled for support of the Confederacy.

|- style="height:2em"
| rowspan=5 | Civil War and Reconstruction
| rowspan=5 nowrap | Mar 11, 1861 –Jul 14, 1868
| rowspan=5 colspan=3 | Vacant

|- style="height:2em"
| rowspan=4 colspan=3 | Vacant
| rowspan=4 nowrap | Jul 11, 1861 –Jul 14, 1868
| rowspan=4 | Civil War and Reconstruction

|- style="height:2em"
| 

|- style="height:2em"
| rowspan=4 | 14
| 

|- style="height:2em"
| rowspan=2 
| rowspan=5 | 14

|- style="height:2em"
! rowspan=2 | 11
| rowspan=2 align=left | Joseph Abbott
| rowspan=2  | Republican
| rowspan=2 nowrap | Jul 14, 1868 –Mar 3, 1871
| rowspan=2 | Elected in 1868 to finish vacant term.Lost renomination.
| rowspan=4 | Elected in 1868 to finish vacant term.Retired.
| rowspan=4 nowrap | Jul 14, 1868 –Mar 3, 1873
| rowspan=4  | Republican
| rowspan=4 align=right | John Pool
! rowspan=4 | 16

|- style="height:2em"
| 

|- style="height:2em"
| colspan=3 | Vacant
| nowrap | Mar 4, 1871 –Jan 30, 1872
| Legislature failed to elect
| rowspan=4 | 15
| rowspan=2 

|- style="height:2em"
! rowspan=15 | 12
| rowspan=15 align=left | Matt Whitaker Ransom
| rowspan=15  | Democratic
| rowspan=15 nowrap | Jan 30, 1872 –Mar 3, 1895
| rowspan=3 | Elected to finish vacant term.

|- style="height:2em"
| 
| rowspan=3 | 15
| rowspan=3 | Elected in 1872.Lost re-election.
| rowspan=3 nowrap | Mar 4, 1873 –Mar 3, 1879
| rowspan=3  | Democratic
| rowspan=3 align=right | Augustus Merrimon
! rowspan=3 | 17

|- style="height:2em"
| 

|- style="height:2em"
| rowspan=3 | Re-elected in 1876.
| rowspan=3 | 16
| 

|- style="height:2em"
| 
| rowspan=3 | 16
| rowspan=3 | Elected in 1879.
| rowspan=8 nowrap | Mar 4, 1879 –Apr 14, 1894
| rowspan=8  | Democratic
| rowspan=8 align=right | Zebulon Vance
! rowspan=8 | 18

|- style="height:2em"
| 

|- style="height:2em"
| rowspan=3 | Re-elected in 1883.
| rowspan=3 | 17
| 

|- style="height:2em"
| 
| rowspan=3 | 17
| rowspan=3 | Re-elected in 1884.

|- style="height:2em"
| 

|- style="height:2em"
| rowspan=6 | Re-elected in 1889.Lost re-election.
| rowspan=6 | 18
| 

|- style="height:2em"
| 
| rowspan=6 | 18
| rowspan=2 | Re-elected in 1890.Died.

|- style="height:2em"
| rowspan=4 

|- style="height:2em"
|  
| nowrap | Apr 14, 1894 –Apr 19, 1894
| colspan=3 | Vacant

|- style="height:2em"
| Appointed to continue Vance's term.Successor qualified.
| nowrap | Apr 19, 1894 –Jan 23, 1895
|  | Democratic
| align=right | Thomas Jordan Jarvis
! 19

|- style="height:2em"
| rowspan=2 | Elected in 1894 to finish Vance's term.
| rowspan=5 nowrap | Jan 23, 1895 –Mar 3, 1903
| rowspan=5  | Republican
| rowspan=5 align=right | Jeter Pritchard
! rowspan=5 | 20

|- style="height:2em"
! rowspan=3 | 13
| rowspan=3 align=left | Marion Butler
| rowspan=3  | Populist
| rowspan=3 nowrap | Mar 4, 1895 –Mar 3, 1901
| rowspan=3 | Elected in 1894.Lost re-election.
| rowspan=3 | 19
| 

|- style="height:2em"
| 
| rowspan=3 | 19
| rowspan=3 | Re-elected in 1897.Lost re-election.

|- style="height:2em"
| 

|- style="height:2em"
! rowspan=16 | 14
| rowspan=16 align=left | Furnifold McLendel Simmons
| rowspan=16  | Democratic
| rowspan=16 nowrap | Mar 4, 1901 –Mar 3, 1931
| rowspan=3 | Elected in 1901.
| rowspan=3 | 20
| 

|- style="height:2em"
| 
| rowspan=3 | 20
| rowspan=3 | Elected in 1903.
| rowspan=14 nowrap | Mar 4, 1903 –Dec 12, 1930
| rowspan=14  | Democratic
| rowspan=14 align=right | Lee Slater Overman
! rowspan=14 | 21

|- style="height:2em"
| 

|- style="height:2em"
| rowspan=3 | Re-elected in 1907.
| rowspan=3 | 21
| 

|- style="height:2em"
| 
| rowspan=3 | 21
| rowspan=3 | Re-elected in 1909

|- style="height:2em"
| 

|- style="height:2em"
| rowspan=3 | Re-elected in 1913
| rowspan=3 | 22
| 

|- style="height:2em"
| 
| rowspan=3 | 22
| rowspan=3 | Re-elected in 1914.

|- style="height:2em"
| 

|- style="height:2em"
| rowspan=3 | Re-elected in 1918.
| rowspan=3 | 23
| 

|- style="height:2em"
| 
| rowspan=3 | 23
| rowspan=3 | Re-elected in 1920.

|- style="height:2em"
| 

|- style="height:2em"
| rowspan=4 | Re-elected in 1924.Lost renomination.
| rowspan=4 | 24
| 

|- style="height:2em"
| 
| rowspan=5 | 24
| rowspan=2 | Re-elected in 1926.Died.

|- style="height:2em"
| rowspan=2 

|- style="height:2em"
| rowspan=2 | Appointed to continue Overman's term.Lost election to finish Overman's term.
| rowspan=2 nowrap | Dec 13, 1930 –Dec 4, 1932
| rowspan=2  | Democratic
| rowspan=2 align=right | Cameron A. Morrison
! rowspan=2 | 22

|- style="height:2em"
! rowspan=9 | 15
| rowspan=9 align=left | Josiah Bailey
| rowspan=9  | Democratic
| rowspan=9 nowrap | Mar 4, 1931 –Dec 15, 1946
| rowspan=4 | Elected in 1930.
| rowspan=4 | 25
| rowspan=2 

|- style="height:2em"
| Elected to finish Overman's term.
| rowspan=7 nowrap | Dec 5, 1932 –Jan 3, 1945
| rowspan=7  | Democratic
| rowspan=7 align=right | Robert Reynolds
! rowspan=7 | 23

|- style="height:2em"
| 
| rowspan=3 | 25
| rowspan=3 | Elected to full term in 1932.

|- style="height:2em"
| 

|- style="height:2em"
| rowspan=3 | Re-elected in 1936.
| rowspan=3 | 26
| 

|- style="height:2em"
| 
| rowspan=3 | 26
| rowspan=3 | Re-elected in 1938.Retired.

|- style="height:2em"
| 

|- style="height:2em"
| rowspan=2 | Re-elected in 1942.Died.
| rowspan=6 | 27
| 

|- style="height:2em"
| rowspan=3 
| rowspan=9 | 27
| rowspan=9 | Elected in 1944.
| rowspan=11 nowrap | Jan 3, 1945 –May 12, 1954
| rowspan=11  | Democratic
| rowspan=11 align=right | Clyde R. Hoey
! rowspan=11 | 24

|- style="height:2em"
| colspan=3 | Vacant
| nowrap | Dec 15, 1946 –Dec 18, 1946
|  

|- style="height:2em"
! rowspan=2 | 16
| rowspan=2 align=left | William B. Umstead
| rowspan=2  | Democratic
| rowspan=2 nowrap | Dec 18, 1946 –Dec 30, 1948
| rowspan=2 | Appointed to continue Bailey's term.Lost election to finish Bailey's term.

|- style="height:2em"
| rowspan=2 

|- style="height:2em"
! rowspan=2 | 17
| rowspan=2 align=left | J. Melville Broughton
| rowspan=2  | Democratic
| rowspan=2 nowrap | Dec 31, 1948 –Mar 6, 1949
| Elected to finish Bailey's term.

|- style="height:2em"
| Elected to full term in 1948.Died.
| rowspan=11 | 28
| rowspan=4 

|- style="height:2em"
| colspan=3 | Vacant
| nowrap | Mar 6, 1949 –Mar 29, 1949
|  

|- style="height:2em"
! 18
| align=left | Frank Graham
|  | Democratic
| nowrap | Mar 29, 1949 –Nov 26, 1950
| Appointed to continue Broughton's term.Lost nomination to finish Broughton's term.

|- style="height:2em"
! rowspan=5 | 19
| rowspan=5 align=left | Willis Smith
| rowspan=5  | Democratic
| rowspan=5 nowrap | Nov 27, 1950 –Jun 26, 1953
| rowspan=5 | Elected to finish Broughton's term.Died.

|- style="height:2em"
| 
| rowspan=8 | 28
| rowspan=2 | Re-elected in 1950.Died.

|- style="height:2em"
| rowspan=6 

|- style="height:2em"
|  
| nowrap | May 12, 1954 –Jun 5, 1954
| colspan=3 | Vacant

|- style="height:2em"
| rowspan=5 | Appointed to continue Hoey's term.Elected in 1954 to finish Hoey's term.
| rowspan=16 nowrap | Jun 5, 1954 –Dec 31, 1974
| rowspan=16  | Democratic
| rowspan=16 align=right | Sam Ervin
! rowspan=16 | 25

|- style="height:2em"
| colspan=3 | Vacant
| nowrap | Jun 26, 1953 –Jul 10, 1953
|  

|- style="height:2em"
! 20
| align=left | Alton Lennon
|  | Democratic
| nowrap | Jul 10, 1953 –Nov 28, 1954
| Appointed to continue Smith's term.Lost nomination to finish Smith's term.

|- style="height:2em"
! rowspan=3 | 21
| rowspan=3 align=left | W. Kerr Scott
| rowspan=3  | Democratic
| rowspan=3 nowrap | Nov 29, 1954 –Apr 16, 1958
| Elected in 1954 to finish Smith's term.

|- style="height:2em"
| rowspan=2 | Elected to full term in 1954.Died.
| rowspan=5 | 29
| 

|- style="height:2em"
| rowspan=3 
| rowspan=5 | 29
| rowspan=5 | Re-elected in 1956.

|- style="height:2em"
| colspan=3 | Vacant
| nowrap | Apr 16, 1958 –Apr 19, 1958
|  

|- style="height:2em"
! rowspan=8 | 22
| rowspan=8 align=left | B. Everett Jordan
| rowspan=8  | Democratic
| rowspan=8 nowrap | Apr 19, 1958 –Jan 3, 1973
| rowspan=2 | Appointed to continue Scott's term.Elected in 1958 to finish Scott's term.

|- style="height:2em"
| 

|- style="height:2em"
| rowspan=3 | Re-elected in 1960.
| rowspan=3 | 30
| 

|- style="height:2em"
| 
| rowspan=3 | 30
| rowspan=3 | Re-elected in 1962.

|- style="height:2em"
| 

|- style="height:2em"
| rowspan=3 | Re-elected in 1966.Lost renomination.
| rowspan=3 | 31
| 

|- style="height:2em"
| 
| rowspan=4 | 31
| rowspan=3 | Re-elected in 1968.Retired and resigned early.

|- style="height:2em"
| 

|- style="height:2em"
! rowspan=19 | 23
| rowspan=19 align=left | Jesse Helms
| rowspan=19  | Republican
| rowspan=19 nowrap | Jan 3, 1973 –Jan 3, 2003
| rowspan=4 | Elected in 1972.
| rowspan=4 | 32
| rowspan=2 

|- style="height:2em"
|  
| nowrap | Dec 31, 1974 –Jan 3, 1975
| colspan=3 | Vacant

|- style="height:2em"
| 
| rowspan=3 | 32
| rowspan=3 | Elected in 1974.Lost re-election.
| rowspan=3 nowrap | Jan 3, 1975 –Jan 3, 1981
| rowspan=3  | Democratic
| rowspan=3 align=right | Robert Morgan
! rowspan=3 | 26

|- style="height:2em"
| 

|- style="height:2em"
| rowspan=3 | Re-elected in 1978.
| rowspan=3 | 33
| 

|- style="height:2em"
| 
| rowspan=6 | 33
| rowspan=3 | Elected in 1980.Died.
| rowspan=3 nowrap | Jan 3, 1981 –Jun 29, 1986
| rowspan=3  | Republican
| rowspan=3 align=right | John East
! rowspan=3 | 27

|- style="height:2em"
| 

|- style="height:2em"
| rowspan=6 | Re-elected in 1984.
| rowspan=6 | 34
| rowspan=4 

|- style="height:2em"
|  
| nowrap | Jun 29, 1986 –Jul 14, 1986
| colspan=3 | Vacant

|- style="height:2em"
| Appointed to continue East's term.Lost election to finish East's term.
| nowrap | Jul 14, 1986 –Nov 4, 1986
|  | Republican
| align=right | Jim Broyhill
! 28

|- style="height:2em"
| Elected to finish East's term.
| rowspan=4 nowrap | Nov 5, 1986 –Jan 3, 1993
| rowspan=4  | Democratic
| rowspan=4 align=right | Terry Sanford
! rowspan=4 | 29

|- style="height:2em"
| 
| rowspan=3 | 34
| rowspan=3 | Elected to full term in 1986.Lost re-election.

|- style="height:2em"
| 

|- style="height:2em"
| rowspan=3 | Re-elected in 1990.
| rowspan=3 | 35
| 

|- style="height:2em"
| 
| rowspan=3 | 35
| rowspan=3 | Elected in 1992.Lost re-election.
| rowspan=3 nowrap | Jan 3, 1993 –Jan 3, 1999
| rowspan=3  | Republican
| rowspan=3 align=right | Lauch Faircloth
! rowspan=3 | 30

|- style="height:2em"
| 

|- style="height:2em"
| rowspan=3 | Re-elected in 1996.Retired.
| rowspan=3 | 36
| 

|- style="height:2em"
| 
| rowspan=3 | 36
| rowspan=3 | Elected in 1998.Retired to run for U.S. President.
| rowspan=3 nowrap | Jan 3, 1999 –Jan 3, 2005
| rowspan=3  | Democratic
| rowspan=3 align=right | John Edwards
! rowspan=3 | 31

|- style="height:2em"
| 

|- style="height:2em"
! rowspan=3 | 24
| rowspan=3 align=left | Elizabeth Dole
| rowspan=3  | Republican
| rowspan=3 nowrap | Jan 3, 2003 –Jan 3, 2009
| rowspan=3 | Elected in 2002.Lost re-election.
| rowspan=3 | 37
| 

|- style="height:2em"
| 
| rowspan=3 | 37
| rowspan=3 | Elected in 2004.
| rowspan=9 nowrap | Jan 3, 2005 –Jan 3, 2023
| rowspan=9  | Republican
| rowspan=9 align=right | Richard Burr
! rowspan=9 | 32

|- style="height:2em"
| 

|- style="height:2em"
! rowspan=3 | 25
| rowspan=3 align=left | Kay Hagan
| rowspan=3  | Democratic
| rowspan=3 nowrap | Jan 3, 2009 –Jan 3, 2015
| rowspan=3 | Elected in 2008.Lost re-election.
| rowspan=3 | 38
| 

|- style="height:2em"
| 
| rowspan=3 | 38
| rowspan=3 | Re-elected in 2010.

|- style="height:2em"
| 

|- style="height:2em"
! rowspan=6 | 26
| rowspan=6 align=left | Thom Tillis
| rowspan=6  | Republican
| rowspan=6 nowrap | Jan 3, 2015 –Present
| rowspan=3 | Elected in 2014.
| rowspan=3 | 39
| 

|- style="height:2em"
| 
| rowspan=3 | 39
| rowspan=3 | Re-elected in 2016.Retired.

|- style="height:2em"
| 

|- style="height:2em"
| rowspan=3 | Re-elected in 2020.
| rowspan=3 | 40
| 

|- style="height:2em"
| 
| rowspan=3| 40
| rowspan=3| Elected in 2022.
| rowspan=3 nowrap| Jan 3, 2023 –Present
| rowspan=3  | Republican
| rowspan=3 align=right | Ted Budd
! rowspan=3| 33

|- style="height:2em"
| 

|- style="height:2em"
| rowspan=2 colspan=5 | To be determined in the 2026 election.
| rowspan=2| 41
| 

|- style="height:2em"
| 
| 41
| colspan=5 | To be determined in the 2028 election.

See also

 United States congressional delegations from North Carolina
 List of United States representatives from North Carolina
 Elections in North Carolina

References

External links 
 

 
United States senators
North Carolina